Hermia is a fictional character from A Midsummer Night's Dream.

Hermia may also refer to:

 685 Hermia, an S-type asteroid
 Hermia (Finland), a science park
 Hermia (Cilicia)